Pigment Red 190 (C.I. 71140), also called Vat Red 29, is a synthetic organic compound that is used both as a pigment and as a vat dye. Although structurally a derivative of perylene, it is produced from acenaphthene. 

It is usually applied for cotton fabric, jig dyeing, PVA and silk dyeing, still may processed into organic pigment.

References 

Perylene dyes
Vat dyes
Imides